BEAT Cycling is a UCI Continental team founded in 2017 that is based in the Netherlands. The team, which competes in both road and track cycling, gained UCI Continental status the following year. The team's founding riders were Matthijs Büchli, Theo Bos and Roy van den Berg. The coach is Tim Veldt.

Team roster

Road

Track

Major results

Road
2018
Ronde van Overijssel, Piotr Havik
Grand Prix Albert Fauville-Baulet, Aksel Nõmmela

2019
Overall Tour of Rhodes, Martijn Budding
Stage 2, Martijn Budding
PWZ Zuidenveld Tour, Luuc Bugter
Overall Tour d'Eure-et-Loir, Luuc Bugter
Stage 3, Luuc Bugter
Stage 1b Tour de la Mirabelle, Martijn Budding
Stage 1 Kreiz Breizh Elites, Team time trial
Stage 3 Kreiz Breizh Elites, Martijn Budding
GP Stad Zottegem, Piotr Havik

Track

2017–2018
UCI Track Cycling World Championships (Team Sprint), Matthijs Büchli
UCI Track Cycling World Cup – Minsk (Sprint), Matthijs Büchli
UCI Track Cycling World Cup – Minsk (Keirin), Matthijs Büchli
UCI Track Cycling World Cup – Minsk (Team Sprint), Roy van den Berg
UCI Track Cycling World Cup – Minsk (Team Sprint), Theo Bos
UCI Track Cycling World Cup – Minsk (Team Sprint), Matthijs Büchli
 Dutch National Track Championships (Keirin), Matthijs Büchli
 Dutch National Track Championships (Sprint), Matthijs Büchli
 Dutch National Track Championships (Team Sprint), Roy van den Berg
 Dutch National Track Championships (Team Sprint), Theo Bos
 Dutch National Track Championships (Team Sprint), Matthijs Büchli
UCI Track Cycling World Cup – Manchester (Keirin), Matthijs Büchli
UCI Track Cycling World Cup – Pruszków  (Keirin), Matthijs Büchli

2018–2019
UCI Track Cycling World Championships (Keirin), Matthijs Büchli
UCI Track Cycling World Championships (Team Sprint), Matthijs Büchli and Roy van den Berg (with Harrie Lavreysen and Jeffrey Hoogland)
UCI Track Cycling World Cup – London(Keirin), Theo Bos
 Dutch National Track Championships (Keirin), Laurine van Riessen
 Dutch National Track Championships (1 km Time Trial), Roy van den Berg
 Dutch National Track Championships (Sprint), Laurine van Riessen
 Dutch National Track Championships (Sprint), Matthijs Büchli
UCI Track Cycling World Cup – London(Keirin), Matthijs Büchli
UCI Track Cycling World Cup – Berlin (Keirin), Matthijs Büchli
 Dutch National Track Championships (Team sprint), Matthijs Büchli, Theo Bos and Roy van den Berg
UCI Track Cycling World Cup – Saint Quentin-en-Yvelines (Keirin), Laurine van Riessen

Notes

References

External links

UCI Continental Teams (Europe)
Cycling teams based in the Netherlands
Cycling teams established in 2016